Sashi Kumar (born 23 February 1952) is an Indian journalist and media personality from Kerala. He worked in Asianet, the country's first regional satellite television channel. He founded and chairs the Media Development Foundation, the not for profit public trust which set up and runs the Asian College of Journalism in Chennai. He was the first West Asia correspondent of  The Hindu in the mid eighties.  He directed the film Kaya Taran in Hindi based on the short story Vanmarangal Veezhumbol (When Big Trees Fall) by writer N. S. Madhavan. He is currently the chairman of Asian College of Journalism, Chennai.

Early life and education
Sashi Kumar  was born at Karupadanna near Kodungallur in Thrissur District of the erstwhile State of Travancore–Cochin. He did his schooling at the Don Bosco Matriculation Higher Secondary School, Chennai. He then completed his graduation from Loyola College, Chennai, and took post graduation in history from the Madras Christian College.

Career

Sashi Kumar started his career in Doordarshan (DD) as a newsreader and producer. Later he worked in PTI-TV as chief producer and general manager of PTI. He authored and presented independent programs on the economy, politics and culture on Indian television like Money Matters, Tana Bana and Jan Manch.

Sashi Kumar is a well known filmmaker as well. He  scripted and directed Kaya Taran (Chrysalis) in Hindi based on the story Vanmarangal Veezhumbol (When Big Tree Falls) by writer N. S. Madhavan. The film won him the Aravindan Puraskaram as the best debut filmmaker of 2004. He acted in Malayalam movies, Iniyum Marichittillatha Nammal, Balyakalasakhi, Loudspeaker, Ennu Ninte Moideen and Love 24x7.

Position
 Member, Empowered Committee on Information, Communication & Technology (ICE), Prime Minister’s Office, New Delhi.
 Member,India Director on the Board of Real News – Independent World Television.
 Member of the Anjuman (court) of the Jamia Millia Islamia University, Delhi, South Asia Foundation (SAF).
 Chairman, Asian College of Journalism
 Chief Editor, Asiaville

Filmography

Bibliography
 Unmediated: Essays on Media, Culture and Cinema, Tulika Books, 2014

Award
2007: Viayaraghavan Memorial Award for his contribution to journalism
2005: G. Aravindan Award for Best Debut Filmmaker for Kaya Taran

References

External links

Malayali people
Journalists from Kerala
People from Thrissur district
Living people
Indian male television journalists
Hindi-language film directors
Indian television presenters
Writers from Kerala
Malayalam-language journalists
University of Madras alumni
Television personalities from Kerala
1952 births